Milan Arsov was a Bulgarian revolutionary, anarchist and a member of Boatmen of Thessaloniki (Gemidziite).

Biography 
Milan Arsov was born in Oraovec, in the Kosovo vilayet of the Ottoman Empire (present-day North Macedonia). He studied in the Bulgarian gymnasium in Thessaloniki "Sts. Cyril and Methodius" and Bitola Bulgarian Exarchate gymnasium but did not graduate it.

He joined the anarchist brotherhood in Thessaloniki (called the Gemidzii) and became part of it. As such he participated in assassinations in Salonika in 1903. On April 15, 1903 Dimitar Mechev, Ilija Trachkov and Milan Arsov detonated the railway line Thessaloniki - Istanbul. The blast damaged several cars and the locomotive, but the passengers were not hurt. The next day Arsov threw a bomb in front of the hotel "Alhambra".
Arsov was one of four survivors from the Gemidzhii, who were put on trial by a military court. Along with Pavel Shatev, Georgi Bogdanov, and Marko Boshnakov they were sentenced to death, but his sentence was commuted to life imprisonment and he along with other assassins had been sent to Fezzan in Sahara.

He died of tuberculosis on June 8, 1908 in Murzuk, but his skull was returned to Macedonia by Pavel Shatev and Georgi Bogdanov.

See also 
 Pavel Shatev
 Georgi Bogdanov
 Marko Boshnakov

References 

1884 births
1908 deaths
Anarchist assassins
People from Kosovo vilayet
Bulgarian revolutionaries
Bulgarian anarchists
Macedonian Bulgarians
Bulgarian people imprisoned abroad
Prisoners who died in Ottoman detention
Bulgarian people who died in prison custody
Bulgarian nationalist assassins
20th-century deaths from tuberculosis
Tuberculosis deaths in the Ottoman Empire